A list of films produced by the Israeli film industry in 1988.

1988 releases

Unknown premiere date

Awards

See also
1988 in Israel

References

External links
 Israeli films of 1988 at the Internet Movie Database

Israeli
Film
1988